The Greene Menopause Index, also known as the Greene Climateric Scale, is a questionnaire a tool used by researchers to study the symptoms of menopause. It is a standard list of 21 questions which women use to rate how much they are bothered by menopause symptoms such as hot flashes, night sweats, rapid heartbeat, and difficulty sleeping.

External links
 Greene Menopause Index entry in the public domain NCI Dictionary of Cancer Terms

Menopause